Yodi Karone (born Alan Dye, 15 March 1954) is a writer of Cameroonian origin. He is the author (in French) of four novels and a play; his novel Nègre de Paille won the Grand prix littéraire d'Afrique noire in 1982. In the 1980s he was one of the "leading young novelists" of a group of writers of African descent who lived in Paris.

Career 
Karone started as a playwright; his first play was Palabres de nuit ("Discussions of Night") in 1978. A second play was published in 1980, Sacré dernier. After that he wrote novels. Karone was a musician and a sculptor also, and this influenced his writing; he drew on "rhythm and visual images to enhance his narrative".

Le bal des caïmans, his first novel, is political, describing injustices suffered when an entire population is oppressed and repressed; a man is chased and captured, and put on trial. The testimony of the witnesses at this parody of a trial make up the novel. According to Ange-Séverin Malanda and Thomas Mpoyi-Buatu, who interviewed Karone in 1980, the limited perspective offered by these characters enhances the force of their experience even while it expressed errors and contradictions. Malanda and Mpoyi-Buatu said this stylistic feature was new in the African novel, and contributed to the idea of a search for subjectivity. Karone said he chose to have the caiman, an animal that does not actually live in Africa, in the title to express a distance from any particular country and achieve a kind of universality.

His 1988 novel A la Recherche du cannibale amour opens in the metro station Châtelet, in Paris, where the protagonist, a novelist from Africa, listens to a saxophone player, and promptly loses the manuscript for his novel. This starts a search that takes him to Cameroon and then to Harlem, and then back.

Works

Drama
Palabres de nuit (1978)
Sacré dernier (1980)

Fiction
Le bal des Caïmans (1980)
Nègre de Paille (1982)
A la Recherche du cannibale amour (1988)
Les beaux gosses (1988)

References  

1954 births
Living people
Cameroonian male writers